Juan Carlos Nellar (born 23 January 1994) is an Argentine professional footballer who plays as a central midfielder (box-to-box) for Round Glass Punjab FC in the I-League. Besides Argentina, he has played in Italy and India.

Club career
Born in  Argentina, Nellar made his senior debut with Spanish side Lorca FC in the 2019-20 season in the TERCERA DIVISIÓN RFEF of Spain. He made 8 appearances for his side in that season.
Juan first came to play in India, when he signed for Gokulam Kerala in August 2022. Juan added steel in the centre of the pitch for the Malabarians and made 9 appearances in the I-League for them before switching to Round Glass Punjab FC in January.

Juan was given the jersey number 5 in Round Glass Punjab FC. He scored 1 goal and 1 assist in the I-League and provided solidity at the middle of the park to the club as they became champions of 2022–23 I-League.

References

Living people
1994 births
Argentine footballers